Malcolm T. Liepke (born October 31, 1953) is an American painter born in Minneapolis, Minnesota. He studied at the Art Center College of Design in Los Angeles, California, but dropped out after a year and a half. He moved to New York and began studying, on his own, artists such as John Singer Sargent, Edgar Degas, Henri de Toulouse-Lautrec, Diego Velázquez, James McNeill Whistler and Édouard Vuillard. In turn, his style has inspired others.

His art has been on the covers of Time, Newsweek, Forbes and Fortune. His artworks are now in the collection of the Smithsonian Institution and the Brooklyn Museum. Liepke's work has been widely shown and exhibited in the Pastel Society of America, the American Watercolor Society, National Academy of Design and the National Arts Club. Liepke's emphasis has been on figurative artworks. His paintings and drawings often focus on intimate moments of sensual pleasure and introspection.  Malcolm T. Liepke has been selling out his exhibitions since his 1986 show at Eleanor Ettinger Gallery.
Alma Dror and Bari ben Zeev from Telma Yelin School of Art have made a presentation of his life and wrote a dialogue inspired by his art work "Girls' Night."

References

20th-century American painters
American male painters
21st-century American painters
21st-century American male artists
Artists from Minneapolis
1953 births
Living people
20th-century American male artists